Bemaharivo is a town and commune in Madagascar. It belongs to the district of Marovoay, which is a part of Boeny Region in Mahajanga Province. The population of the commune was estimated to be approximately 9,000 in 2001 commune census.

Only primary schooling is available. The majority 55% of the population of the commune are farmers, while an additional 42% receives their livelihood from raising livestock. The most important crop is rice, while other important products are seeds of catechu and raffia palm.  Services provide employment for 1% of the population. Additionally fishing employs 2% of the population.

References and notes 

Populated places in Boeny